Garnet Bay is an arm of the Foxe Basin in the Qikiqtaaluk Region of Nunavut, Canada. It is located on the northern coast of Foxe Peninsula, in western Baffin Island.

Avifauna

References

Bays of Foxe Basin